Glen Mitchell may refer to:

 Glen Mitchell (British cyclist) (born 1958), Olympic cyclist for Great Britain
 Glen Mitchell (New Zealand cyclist) (born 1972), Olympic cyclist for New Zealand
 Glen Mitchell House, house in Dodge City, Kansas, United States

See also
 Glenn Mitchell (disambiguation)

Mitchell, Glen